Mārtiņš is a Latvian masculine given name. It is a cognate of the name Martin.

Mārtiņš may refer to:
Mārtiņš, ancient Latvian deity  
Mārtiņš Antons (1888–1941), Latvian lawyer and politician
Mārtiņš Bondars (born 1971), Latvian financier, politician, and basketball player
Mārtiņš Bots (born 1999), Latvian luger
Mārtiņš Brauns (1951–2021), Latvian composer and musician
Mārtiņš Cipulis (born 1980), Latvian ice hockey left winger
Mārtiņš Freimanis (1977–2011), Latvian musician, singer, songwriter, actor and TV personality
Rūsiņš Mārtiņš Freivalds (1942–2016), Latvian computer scientist and mathematician 
Mārtiņš Grundmanis (1913–1944), Latvian basketball player
Mārtiņš Karsums (born 1986), Latvian professional ice hockey player
Mārtiņš Ķibilds (born ????), Latvian journalist and television personality
Mārtiņš Kravčenko (born 1985), Latvian professional basketball guard 
Mārtiņš Krūmiņš (1900–1992), Latvian-born American Impressionist painter
Mārtiņš Laksa (born 1990), Latvian professional basketball player
Mārtiņš Mazūrs (1908–1995), Latvian cyclist and Olympic competitor
Mārtiņš Meiers (born 1991), Latvian professional basketball player
Mārtiņš Nukša (1878–1942), Latvian diplomat and architect
Mārtiņš Onskulis (born 1994), Latvian alpine skier and Olympic competitor 
Mārtiņš Peniķis (1874–1964), Latvian military general and commander in chief of Latvian Army
Mārtiņš Pļaviņš (born 1985), Latvian beach volleyball player and Olympic medalist
Mārtiņš Pluto (born 1998), Latvian racing cyclist
Mārtiņš Podžus (born 1994), Latvian tennis player
Mārtiņš Porejs (born 1991), Latvian ice hockey player
Mārtiņš Raitums (born 1985), Latvian ice hockey goaltender
Mārtiņš Rītiņš (1949–2022), Latvian chef, businessman and culinary TV presenter 
Mārtiņš Roze (1964–2012), Latvian politician 
Mārtiņš Rubenis (born 1978), Latvian luger and Olympic medalist
Mārtiņš Saulespurēns (born ????), Latvian inventor and engineer
Mārtiņš Sirmais (born 1982), Latvian orienteering competitor 
Mārtiņš Skirmants (born 1977), Latvian basketball player 
Mārtiņš Zīverts (1903–1990), Latvian playwright

See also
Martins (surname)

Latvian masculine given names